Jalal Khan (born 13 August 1927, date of death unknown) was a Pakistani javelin thrower. Khan represented Pakistan at the 1952 Summer Olympics and 1956 Summer Olympics. During the 1950s he was a two-time Asian Games silver medallist and won both a silver and bronze medal in the British Commonwealth Games. His personal best, 73.16m, was set in 1959. Later was killed by relatives over land dispute.

References

External links
Jalal Khan at Sports Reference

1927 births
Year of death missing
Pakistani male javelin throwers
Olympic athletes of Pakistan
Asian Games silver medalists for Pakistan
Asian Games medalists in athletics (track and field)
Athletes (track and field) at the 1952 Summer Olympics
Athletes (track and field) at the 1956 Summer Olympics
Athletes (track and field) at the 1954 Asian Games
Athletes (track and field) at the 1958 Asian Games
Athletes (track and field) at the 1954 British Empire and Commonwealth Games
Athletes (track and field) at the 1958 British Empire and Commonwealth Games
Commonwealth Games silver medallists for Pakistan
Commonwealth Games bronze medallists for Pakistan
Commonwealth Games medallists in athletics
Medalists at the 1954 Asian Games
Medalists at the 1958 Asian Games
20th-century Pakistani people
Medallists at the 1954 British Empire and Commonwealth Games
Medallists at the 1958 British Empire and Commonwealth Games